AETF may refer to:

Air and Space Expeditionary Task Force
All-England Theatre Festival
Alaska Electrical Trust Fund
All European Taekwon-Do Federation
Asia Endosurgery Task Force